Constantin Onofrei (born 9 May 1976) is a Romanian former professional boxer.

Career
As an amateur boxer, Constantin Onofrei won the Romanian National Amateur Boxing Championship at the super heavyweight division in 1995 and represented Romania at the men's super heavyweight event from the 2000 Summer Olympics where he lost in the first round at points against Samuel Peter.
He made his professional debut in 2001 at the age of 25 when he defeated Peter Simko by knockout in the first round of a bout held at Kisstadion from Budapest. He won the German International heavyweight title in 2002 after knocking-out Roman Bugaj in the third round. Onofrei defended the German International heavyweight title twice by defeating Adnan Serin and Goran Gogic but lost it against Taras Bidenko in a fight which was also for the WBO Intercontinental heavyweight title. Onofrei's last match took place in 2007 when he lost by knockout against Timo Hoffmann in the fourth round of a bout held in Stadhalle from Rostock.

Professional boxing record

References

External links
 
1995 Romanian National Championships

1976 births
Living people
Romanian male boxers
Olympic boxers of Romania
Boxers at the 2000 Summer Olympics
People from Fălticeni
Super-heavyweight boxers